This article lists political parties in Belarus.

Parties represented in the National Assembly of Belarus

The president Alexander Lukashenko is independent, and draws most of his support from non-partisan members of parliament. Most non-partisan members of parliament are members of the Belaya Rus organization.

Parties represented in the regional parliaments

Extra-parliamentary parties

Parties loyal to the president
The president secures most of his support from non-partisan members of parliament.

Oppositional parties

Historical parties (1991–present)

Soviet parties (1918–1991)

CPB

Clandestine parties

Independence parties (1917–1918)

See also
 List of political parties by country
 Politics of Belarus

References

External links 
List of political parties from the Ministry of Justice 
Political Parties In Belarus - Do They Really Matter?
Opposition Reshaping: Where Will It Lead?

Belarus
 
Political parties
Political parties
Belarus